Prototrichia metallica is a slime mould species from the order Trichiida and the only species from the genus Prototrichia. It is mainly distributed on mountains.

Characteristics
Prototrichia metallica is a very variable species. The plasmodium is white. The fruit bodies are grouped densely. They are orange brown to  dull brown, occasionally pink, short stemmed or are lying on a heavily regenerated edge, rarely plasmodiokarp sporokarps with a diameter from 0.5 to 2.2 mm. The membranous peridium is transparently thin and shinily iridescent-coloured. Its surface is composed of a coarse mesh arrangement of wrinkled lines, along which it later divides into pieces.

The capillitium is often irregular, usually due to the presence of several yellow-brown, translucent spirally banded strands, which divide towards the outer end. The branches are often intertwined spirals, which sometimes form a network. Many of the outer ends are fused with the upper part of the peridium wall. The spirals are occasionally missing. The thorny spores are pink as mass, orange-brown to brown, individually yellow and have a diameter from 10 to 13, rarely up to 15 µm.

Habitat
Prototrichia metallica has been found in mountainous area of Tasmania, Europe, western North America and South America. It was first found in South America in 1976. It is a "nivicol", meaning that it grows on the snow line at the time of snowmelt.

Classification
The species was first described in 1859 as Trichia metallica by Miles Joseph Berkeley and the genus in 1876 by Joszef Tomasz Rostafinski. Prototrichia was for a long time classified in Dianemidae, periodically even as a separate family of Prototrichiaceae. Since the end of the 1960s, it was asserted that this species is part of Trichiidae. Charles Meylan described in 1921 a further species, Prototrichia schroeteri, and the name is usually the synonym. Nowotny, however, believes that it is a separate species.

References

Myxogastria